Nikitović (Serbian Cyrillic: Hикитoвић) is a Serbian surname that may refer to
Aleksandar Nikitović (born 1979), Serbian basketball coach and former player
Veljko Nikitović (born 1980), Serbian football player
Vladimir Nikitović (born 1980), Serbian football defender
Zoran Nikitovic (born 1957), Serbian association football goalkeeper
Edvard Nikitovic (born 1973), Slovenian basketball player

Serbian surnames